The following is a list of affiliates of Charge!, an American digital broadcast television network owned by the Sinclair Television Group, a subsidiary of the Sinclair Broadcast Group, with operational partner MGM Television, a division of Metro-Goldwyn-Mayer.  The network launched on February 28, 2017, and features action- and adventure-based programming.

At its launch, 57 stations were indicated as original or future affiliates of Charge!  A majority of those stations (41) are stations owned or operated by Sinclair Broadcast Group, with at least two of those stations (WUCW/Minneapolis-Saint Paul and WCWF/Green Bay, Wisconsin) providing their own confirmation of adding Charge! to one of their digital subchannels during launch week.

During Spring 2017, Charge! will be added to other Sinclair owned-or-operated stations.  Additionally, Sinclair will seek carriage deals with stations outside its geographic footprint; a notable example of this was the additions of stations formerly affiliated with the now-shuttered MGM network The Works.  By the end of June 2017, Sinclair hopes Charge! will reach of over 50% of United States television households.

Stations listed in BOLD are Charge! owned-and-operated.

Current affiliates

Former Affiliates

References

External links
WatchCharge.com, the official network website

Charge!